Okinawepipona is a small genus of east Asian potter wasps.

References

Biological pest control wasps
Potter wasps